Basta't Kasama Kita (International title: As Long As I'm With You / ) is a Philippine action comedy drama which was aired on ABS-CBN primetime series from May 26, 2003, to September 10, 2004, replacing Bituin. The series stars Robin Padilla and Judy Ann Santos. 
The show also aired worldwide on ABS-CBN's The Filipino Channel and on a two-week delay on the International Channel (now defunct AZN-TV) in the United States.

The TV series re-aired on the Pinoy Central TV in 2005–2006 and in 2010–2011, it re-aired on Kapamilya Channel. In 2013, it re-aired on Jeepney TV.

Premise
Princess Gonzales (Judy Ann Santos) is a young law graduate who signs up with the National Bureau of Investigation as a rookie agent. Her dedication to her work is fueled by a desire to find out what happened to her father, who disappeared several years before and presumed dead. Her performance later earns her an assignment with the NBI's EAGLES (Elite Agents of Government Against Lawless Elements of Society) squad, where she is paired up with veteran agent Ambet Katindig (Robin Padilla) as they handle tough missions. Although Princess and Ambet's work ethics clash over the course of the series, their bond develops into a relationship by the end.

Cast and characters

Lead cast 
 Robin Padilla as Alberto 'Ambet' Katindig
 Judy Ann Santos as Princess Gonzales
 Rommel Padilla as Atty. Phillip 'Buhawi' Felipe Agda

Also as main cast 
 Gina Pareño as Nanay Ligaya
 Lito Pimentel as Chief Adan K. Abordo
 John Arcilla as agent Godofredo "Prince" Gonzales         
 Sylvia Sanchez as Strawberry Gonzales
 Tetchie Agbayani as Marina Lagdameo
 John Apacible as Abdon Lagdameo
 Diego Castro III as Borgy
 Charlie Davao as Federico Gonzales
 Marc Acueza as Jovan Lagdameo
 Marianne dela Riva as Soledad
 Mylene Dizon as Joyce
 TJ Trinidad as John Paul
 Edgar Mortiz as Kiko
 Hazel Ann Mendoza as Pretty
 Robert Arevalo as Ignacio
 Dominic Ochoa as George
 Angelica Jones as Shai
 Hyubs Azarcon as Cholo Pugadlawin
 Jiro Manio as Hapon
 Jeffrey Santos as Aldrin

Extended cast 
 Giorgia Ortega as Lady Godiva
 Camille Prats as Diamante/Susan
 Asia Agcaoili as Rowena Macaraeg
 Michelle Bayle as Mariel Buenaflor
 Anton Bernardo as Danny Balboa
 Maricar de Mesa as Lyra Manuel
 Jojit Lorenzo as Paolo Macapanas
 Lui Manansala as Ellen Rosales
 Gerard Pizzaras as Alan Balano
 Mike Magat as Marco Garcia
 Rodel Velayo as Edwin Buenaflor
 Evangeline Pascual as Mrs. Peters
 Hannah Camille Bustillos as Vilma
 Nikki Valdez as Alex 
 Pauleen Luna as Karina 
 Neil Ryan Sese as Buloy
 June Hidalgo as Kidlat
 July Hidalgo
 Zaldy "Mar" Castillo
 Mark Dionisio as Rey "Acid thrower"
 Toffee Calma as Wang
 Bing Davao as Gatmaitan
 Gigette Reyes as Pia
 Jen Rosendahl as LaToya
 Rodolfo Solis Jr. as Rigor
 Gem Ramos as Alan's Wife
 Manolito Ong
 Renato Rodriguez
 Mark Matibag
 Ronald Bingwaoel
 Francis Noblefranca
 Jethro Carandang
 Ferdinand dela Cruz
 Carlene Aguilar
 Ama Quiambao
 Jhong Hilario
 Cherry Lou
 Michael Conan
 Caridad Sanchez
 Chandro Concepcion
 Angel de Leon

Reception
The finale posted a 52.5% in the Mega Manila TV Ratings according to AGB Philippines. The show became known for doing the first ever live finale (in 2004) for any drama series on Philippine television behind the rival soap opera of GMA Network Te Amo, Maging Sino Ka Man, which also ended the following week.

See also
List of shows previously aired by ABS-CBN
List of ABS-CBN drama series

References

External links

ABS-CBN drama series
2003 Philippine television series debuts
2004 Philippine television series endings
Television series by Star Creatives
AZN Television original programming
Philippine action television series
Filipino-language television shows
Television shows set in the Philippines